Markéta Jílková (née Zinnerová)  (born 21 June 1942, Brno, Protectorate of Bohemia and Moravia (now Czech Republic)) is a Czech novelist, screenwriter, author of literature for children and youth. After studying in Prague, she worked in awareness-raising facilities in Liberec and Sokolov. From 1962 to 1964, she was employed as a train attendant. At the end of the sixties, she worked for the publishers of Mladý svět and Květy. From 1971 to 1976, she broadcast a literary show for children and youth for Czechoslovak television. Since 1976, she has been a writer by profession. She worked for the brief Czechoslovak Radio and, from 1991 to 1992, worked as a methodologist at a children's home. From 1981 to 1985, she studied dramaturgy and screenwriting at Prague's FAMU.

External links
 Markéta Zinnerová - video from the 13th chamber of the Czech TV cycle
 Markéta Zinnerová in the Dictionary of Czech literature after 1945

1942 births
Living people
Writers from Brno
Czech children's writers
20th-century Czech women writers
21st-century Czech women writers
Czech women children's writers
Czech women writers